Dream Country is the third trade paperback collection of the comic book series The Sandman, published by DC Comics. It collects issues #17–20. It is written by Neil Gaiman, illustrated by Kelley Jones, Charles Vess, Colleen Doran and Malcolm Jones III, coloured by Robbie Busch and Steve Oliff, and lettered by Todd Klein.

It was first issued in paperback in 1991, and later in hardback in 1995 with an introduction by Steve Erickson.

This volume contains four independent stories. The first story, "Calliope", contains the first reference to Dream's son Orpheus, who will play an important role later in the series. The second story, "A Dream of a Thousand Cats", is one of the most enduringly popular issues of the entire series. Sandman #19, "A Midsummer Night's Dream", introduces Morpheus' creative partnership with William Shakespeare, and was the only comic book to win a World Fantasy Award. Lastly, this volume has the first story in which Dream does not appear, "Façade". The collected edition also includes Gaiman's script for "Calliope".

It is preceded by The Doll's House and followed by Season of Mists.

Synopsis

Like the sixth collection, Fables and Reflections, and the eighth, Worlds' End, Dream Country consists of short stories that do not have a common storyline running through them, though it has been argued that most Sandman stories are not entirely self-contained and are part of a larger story arc that encompasses the entire series.

Dream Country is the shortest of the eleven Sandman collections, featuring just four issues ("Calliope", #17, and "A Dream of a Thousand Cats", #18, both pencilled by Kelley Jones and inked by Malcolm Jones III; "A Midsummer Night's Dream", #19, drawn by Charles Vess and coloured for the first time by computer colouring pioneer Steve Oliff; and "Façade", #20, penciled by Colleen Doran and inked by Malcolm Jones III).

"Calliope"
This is the story of a frustrated author, Richard Madoc, whose first book has been released to critical acclaim but who simply cannot write a page of the promised follow-up. He strikes a deal with an elder writer, Erasmus Fry, for Calliope, one of the Muses of Greek mythology, whom Fry had captured earlier in his life, in exchange for a bezoar. Fry kept her imprisoned and regularly raped her, and her presence provided the inspiration for his successful novels.

Madoc also takes her captive and has great success in writing, but Calliope calls upon the triad of witches known by many names, such as the Furies, the Kindly Ones or the Gracious Ladies, for help. They direct her to Morpheus, who we are told was once her lover (this relationship is elaborated on later in the series), and who is currently similarly imprisoned. Upon his release, he comes to rescue Calliope, and visits a terrible punishment upon Madoc. He complains that without her, he will have no ideas, so Morpheus causes him to never stop having them, which drives him to madness.

Though the story "Calliope" was not criticized for unoriginality at the time of its release, its concept has apparently become a very popular one since; a list of overused story ideas at Strange Horizons included "Creative person meets a muse (either one of the nine classical Muses or a more individual muse) and interacts with them, usually by keeping them captive." (See Neil Gaiman's post about Strange Horizon's list).

Madoc's book "Her Wings" appears in a few other stories by Neil Gaiman including "The Last Temptation" as a sort of inside joke. Rose Walker is later seen reading Fry's book "Here Comes a Candle". In the library of Dream, an unfinished book by Erasmus Fry, "The Hand of Glory", is seen in Season of Mists.

One of Madoc's works, "The Spirit Who Had Half Of Everything", takes its name from an unused chapter title in an early draft of James Branch Cabell's Figures of Earth.

"A Dream of a Thousand Cats"
This tale begins with a small, white cat being called by another cat to sneak away from her house one night. They speak of an event in a graveyard that they do not want to miss. When they arrive, they see that many cats are already there. A Siamese cat comes to tell her story.

A long time ago, the Siamese cat relates, she met a tom-cat, who became her lover. Eventually, she gave birth to several kittens. Her human owners were not pleased, and the male owner put the kittens in a bag bound to a rock, and threw them off a bridge into a river. Traumatized by the callous murder of her kittens, the Siamese becomes disillusioned with human beings and ultimately rejects the life of a pampered pet. Her cause is strengthened when she has a dream that she has entered a boneyard in the Dreaming. In the dream a raven with no skin on its head informs her where she can find out exactly why the humans killed her offspring: a cave inhabited by the Dream Lord. At the entrance to the cave that the raven told her of, many fearsome animals tell her to leave. She responds by saying that she will only state her business to Dream. Inside, she finds Dream in the form of a cat.

Dream presents her with a vision of an alternative reality where cats are huge and humans are merely their playthings, tiny servants which groom their bodies and which the cats can kill at their leisure. A man ruined that world by informing the humans that their dreams will shape the world. Enough humans listened to make the vision a reality. Upon waking, the cat undertakes a spiritual quest for justice. She preaches her vision to motley assortments of housecats around the world, hoping that if she can make enough cats believe in and dream of this reality, the world will change to conform to their dreams.

The cat from the beginning of the story heads home. Her friends were slightly disappointed, though they admitted that what they heard was interesting. The white cat, however, was fully taken by the tale. She returns home and heads to sleep. Over breakfast, her owners remark on what a cute stance she is in: it looks as if she is hunting something, or someone.

Although seemingly a complete diversion from the basic story of the Sandman, it in fact illustrates some of the core themes of the series: the idea that reality is shaped in the most literal sense by the dreams, beliefs, and expectations of humans (and, in this case, of other animals as well). The story also portrays the theme of change and its relation to an individual's nature. The humans found that they were unhappy with their role and were able to harness the power of dream to instigate a change of the nature of reality, whereas when cats found themselves in a similar situation their apathetic, independent, and fickle nature kept them from changing. This idea of the capacity for change reemerges throughout the book, most notably in The Sandman Overture and the climactic conclusion of The Kindly Ones.

"A Midsummer Night's Dream"
This is a core issue of the Sandman series, sometimes cited as the best in the series. It depicts the premiere of William Shakespeare's A Midsummer Night's Dream, performed on the hills near Wilmington before an audience of bizarre creatures from Faerie, including the very characters who appear in the play: Titania, Auberon, Peaseblossom, and Robin Goodfellow (Puck).

Puck greatly enjoys the play and repeats the theme of the story that while the play does not directly reflect history or even some of the personalities of the characters it is still considered a true reflection of "reality"; toward the end of the play, he disables the actor representing himself, and represents himself on stage. Meanwhile, Titania takes an interest in Shakespeare's son Hamnet, who plays a small role in the play.

The issue received a World Fantasy Award for short fiction in 1991. 

Dream first meets Shakespeare in Sandman #13, "Men of Good Fortune," and the final issue, #75, "The Tempest," focuses on the second of the two plays commissioned by Morpheus.

"Façade"
This issue depicts the life of one of the neglected characters from the DC Universe: Element Girl (Urania Blackwell), the female counterpart to Metamorpho. Urania—by this point, going by the nickname "Rainie"—has retired from her superhero career, and lives a meager existence, rarely leaving her flat due to her loathing of her "freakish" appearance.

The plot revolves around a phone call she receives: an invitation to have dinner with an old friend, Della. She concocts a fake face to wear so her friend does not know of her "skin disease". As Della explains a problem she is having, Rainie's "face" falls into the plate of spaghetti bolognese that she ordered, revealing her true face. She runs away, and to her apartment, where she wonders how she can kill herself, despite being invulnerable. Fortunately, Death, who was dealing with a woman who had slipped on a stepladder, enters her room, explaining that the door was open, and she had heard her crying. She tells her how she can talk to the sun god, Ra, and beg for a merciful death.

The story ends with Death answering Rainie's telephone and informing the caller that "she's gone away, I'm afraid."

Issues collected

References

Further reading

External links
 The Annotated Sandman

Comic book collection books
1991 books
World Fantasy Award-winning works
Cultural depictions of William Shakespeare
Comics based on works by William Shakespeare